The Military ranks of Ecuador are the military insignia used by the Armed Forces of Ecuador.

Commissioned officer ranks
The rank insignia of commissioned officers.

Other ranks
The rank insignia of non-commissioned officers and enlisted personnel.

Historic ranks

References

External links
 
 
 

Ecuador
Military of Ecuador